Kahriz-e Kalan (also Romanized as Kahrīz-e Kalān) is a village in Khezel-e Gharbi Rural District, in the Central District of Kangavar County, Kermanshah Province, Iran. At the 2006 census, its population was 95, in 20 families.

References 

Populated places in Kangavar County